David Waisman Rjavinsthi (born 4 May 1937) is a Peruvian politician who served as the Second Vice President of Peru from 2001 to 2006. He also served as Congressman from 2000 to 2011.

Early life 
Son of Natan Waisman Reines and Blima Rjavinsthi Tubac, who came to Peru as young people fleeing anti-Semitic policies that were developing in Europe. He studied primary education at the José Granda school and the first years of secondary school at the Hipólito Unanue school; however, he did not finish school.

Political career

He is a member of Perú Posible since 1994, and was elected as a Congressman in the 2000, 2001, and 2006 elections, representing Lima. In the 2000 elections, Waisman ran as the second running mate of Alejandro Toledo, but the ticket was defeated by the ticket of Alberto Fujimori in the runoff in which, Toledo withdrew.

In 2000-01 Waisman led a Peruvian congressional investigation commission that investigated corruption and a range of illegal activities.

Second Vice President 
On 28 July 2001, Waisman became Second Vice President of Peru in Alejandro Toledo's government, and served as such from 2001 to 2006. When Raúl Diez Canseco resigned as First Vice President in 2004 after a scandal with his girlfriend, Waisman became the only Vice President of Peru until 2006. He was also Defense Minister during Toledo's presidency. He attained these positions in government in spite of the fact that he does not have any post-secondary studies and did not finish secondary school. He later resigned as Defense Minister in 2002.

2006 elections 
In 2006, he was initially appointed by Perú Posible as a presidential candidate but independent Jeanette Emmanuel later replaced him as Perú Posible's candidate.  With her withdrawal, Rafael Belaúnde was appointed as the new candidate, but he also withdrew. He instead ran for Congress, and was successfully re-elected as one of the only 2 congressman from Perú Posible, aside from Carlos Bruce.

2011 elections 
He is considering running for Vice President once more in the upcoming early 2011 elections alongside Luis Castañeda, after having switched from Perú Posible due to irreconcilable differences with Toledo, to Partido Solidaridad Nacional. He lost his Congressional seat consequently.

Link
 David Waisman website
 Congress of Peru site

References 

1937 births
Peruvian Jews
Jewish Peruvian politicians
Vice presidents of Peru
Peruvian people of Romanian-Jewish descent
Possible Peru politicians
Members of the Congress of the Republic of Peru
Defense ministers of Peru
People from Lambayeque Region
Living people
National Solidarity Party (Peru) politicians